Dewdney may refer to:

People

Places in Canada
 Dewdney (electoral district), a former electoral district in British Columbia
 Dewdney, British Columbia, an unincorporated community, formerly a district municipality, in the Fraser Valley of British Columbia
 Dewdney Trail, a colonial-era route across southern British Columbia
 Dewdney Trunk Road, one of the earliest main roads in the Lower Mainland of British Columbia
 Dewdney-Alouette Regional District, a former regional district in British Columbia
 Regina Dewdney, a federal electoral district in Regina, Saskatchewan
 Dewdney Avenue, a main collector roadway in Regina, Saskatchewan